Cameraperson is a 2016 autobiographical collage documentary film. The film is an account by director Kirsten Johnson about her life and career as a cinematographer. It relies on footage shot by Johnson across the years in numerous different countries.

Cameraperson premiered at the Sundance Film Festival to critical acclaim and won the top prize at the Sheffield Doc/Fest.

Reception
Cameraperson has a 99% "Certified Fresh" rating on Rotten Tomatoes based on 88 reviews, with an average score of 8.4/10; the site's consensus reads: "Fresh and inventive yet immediately accessible, Cameraperson distills its subject's life and career into an experience that should prove immediately absorbing even for those unfamiliar with her work." On Metacritic, the film has a weighted average score of 86, indicating "Universal Acclaim".

Accolades
As of January 2017, Cameraperson  has won 23 international awards, including the following:

Home media
As it was distributed by Janus Films, Cameraperson was released by Criterion on 7 February 2017 on Blu-ray and DVD.

References

External links
 
 
 
 
 
 Cameraperson: Getting Close an essay by Michael Almereyda at the Criterion Collection

2016 films
2016 documentary films
American documentary films
Collage film
Documentary films about cinematography
2010s English-language films
2010s American films
English-language documentary films